Ahmed Kemal A-Dahar (born 1906, died 6 February 1984) was an Israeli Arab politician who served as a member of the Knesset for Progress and Development between 1959 and 1965.

Biography
Born in Nazareth during the Ottoman era, A-Dahar was a member of Nazareth's city council for thirty years. In 1959 he was elected to the Knesset on the Progress and Development list. He retained his seat in the 1961 elections, but lost it in the 1965 elections. He died in 1984.

References

External links
 

1906 births
1984 deaths
Arab members of the Knesset
Arab people in Mandatory Palestine
Arabs in Ottoman Palestine
City councillors of Nazareth
Members of the 4th Knesset (1959–1961)
Members of the 5th Knesset (1961–1965)
Politicians from Nazareth
Progress and Development politicians